Sidnei da Silva (born September 16, 1980 in Taquaritinga), or simply Magal, is a Brazilian right back. He currently plays for XV de Novembro.

Contract
Inter (Loan) 15 May 2007 to 31 December 2008
Guaratinguetá 14 December 2006 to 31 December 2009

External links

CBF 

Guardian Stats Centre
internacional.com.br 

1980 births
Living people
Brazilian footballers
União São João Esporte Clube players
Sertãozinho Futebol Clube players
Associação Atlética Ponte Preta players
Associação Atlética Portuguesa (Santos) players
Esporte Clube Juventude players
Esporte Clube São Bento players
América Futebol Clube (RN) players
Sport Club Internacional players
Figueirense FC players
Esporte Clube Vitória players
Fortaleza Esporte Clube players
Red Bull Brasil players
Mogi Mirim Esporte Clube players
Association football defenders
People from Taquaritinga